Frank Jones may refer to:

Frank Jones (politician) (1832–1902), U.S. representative
Frank Jones (baseball) (1858–1936), baseball player
Frank Jones (priest) (1861–1935), Anglican archdeacon of Barnstaple
Frank Jones (American football tackle) (fl. 1904–1905), college football player
Frank Jones (American football coach) (1918–2009), American football coach
Frank Jones (footballer) (born 1960), Welsh former footballer
Frank Jones Jr. (born 1948), American luger
Adi Da (Franklin Albert Jones, 1939–2008), American spiritual teacher
Frank Fernando Jones (1855–1941), American politician, businessman, and murder suspect
Frank Lancaster Jones (born 1937), Australian sociologist
Frank Leith Jones, American academic, public servant and military historian
Frank M. Jones, American merchant and politician from New York
Frank Melville Jones (1866–1941), Anglican colonial bishop

See also
Francis Jones (disambiguation)
Franklin Jones (disambiguation)